The Holy See is the apostolic episcopal see of the bishop of Rome, known as the Pope.

It may also refer to:

Holy See of Alexandria, see of the Coptic Orthodox Patriarchate of Alexandria, and of the Greek Orthodox Patriarchate of Alexandria
Holy See of Antioch, historical see of the Syriac Orthodox Patriarchate of Antioch, and of the Greek Orthodox Patriarchate of Antioch 
Holy See of Cilicia, the Armenian Catholicosate of the Great House of Cilicia, located in Antelias, Lebanon
Holy See of Constantinople, see of the Ecumenical Patriarchate of Constantinople
Holy See of Jerusalem, multiple sees
Holy See of Mainz, the historic title of the Roman Catholic Diocese of Mainz in Germany.

See also
HolyC, the system programming language in TempleOS